The Copa de la Primera Dama de la Nación is a women's association football competition in Equatorial Guinea. pitting regional teams against each other. It was established in 2003. It is the women's equivalent of the Equatoguinean Cup for men.

Finals

Most successful clubs

See also
 Equatoguinean Primera División femenina
 Equatoguinean Super Copa femenina

References

Equ
Football competitions in Equatorial Guinea